GTB may refer to:
a music group from East Africa founded by gtbemzee and Mightytrevon [Glad To Be]
 Gran Turismo Berlinetta, Ferrari car models
 Global Trust Bank (India)
 Goolpur Talbani railway station (Pakistan)
 Textile and Clothing Union (Gewerkschaft Textil-Bekleidung), a former German trade union
 GTB (advertising agency), Dearborn, Michigan, US
 Wheeler-Sack Army Airfield, Fort Drum, New York, US, FAA LID
 BT (musician), alias
 Grand Theft Bus, a Canadian indie rock band
 Google Toolbar
 GTB Standard Time, an alternative name for Eastern European Time (used in Greece, Turkey, Bulgaria)